Notre-Dame-de-l'Assomption is a Roman Catholic church in the First arrondissement of Paris, France. The building was constructed between 1670 and 1676 when it was consecrated. Since 1844 it has been the main Polish church of Paris, situated at 263, Rue Saint-Honoré.

History 

In the 17th century, a house belonging to the Jesuit order on the corner of Rue Saint-Honoré and what is now Place Maurice-Barrès, was ceded to the women's religious order of the "Ladies of the Assumption" ("Dames de l'Assomption") who transformed the site into a convent under the aegis of architect Charles Errard in 1670. He, it appears, keen on Italian art and its relics from Antiquity and the Renaissance used them as inspiration for the project, in addition to his own style. As he was detained in Rome doing his research, the execution of the building was assured by a M. Chéret, the clerk of works. On his return, in the face of criticisms of the work, Charles Errard blamed Chéret for having modified his plans.

Subsequently the convent of "Les Dames de l'Assomption" was used as a refuge into the religious life by certain well-born women from the Royal Court under the Ancien Régime. When the French Revolution struck, the building became military barracks in 1793. After the French Restoration, the abandoned building was donated by Monsignor Affre to the Polish Catholic Mission in 1844 for use by the many Polish migrants in Paris at that time.

In 1907 the church was listed as an historical monument.

The church organ
The organ dates from the end of the 19th century. It was designed by the renowned organ-builder, Aristide Cavaillé-Coll.

See also 
 Great Emigration
 Polish Catholic Mission
 List of historic churches in Paris

References

External links 

 http://www.paris.catholique.fr/-eglise-notre-dame-de-l-assomption-.html (French)
 Église Notre-Dame de l'Assomption (Polish)
 musicamsacram.pl - Organ description (Polish)
 Aristide Cavaillé-Coll

Roman Catholic churches in the 1st arrondissement of Paris
Polish diaspora in Europe
France–Poland relations